Uzbekistan (/ ,), officially the Republic of Uzbekistan ( / ), is a doubly landlocked country located in Central Asia. It is surrounded by five landlocked countries: Kazakhstan to the north; Kyrgyzstan to the northeast; Tajikistan to the southeast; Afghanistan to the south; and Turkmenistan to the southwest. Its capital and largest city is Tashkent. Uzbekistan is part of the Turkic world, as well as a member of the Organization of Turkic States. The Uzbek language is the majority-spoken language in Uzbekistan, while Russian is widely spoken and understood throughout the country. Tajik is also spoken as a minority language, predominantly in Samarkand and Bukhara. Islam is the predominant religion in Uzbekistan, most Uzbeks being Sunni Muslims.

The first recorded settlers in what is now Uzbekistan were Eastern Iranian nomads, known as Scythians, who founded kingdoms in Khwarazm (8th–6th centuries BC), Bactria (8th–6th centuries BC), Sogdia (8th–6th centuries BC), Fergana (3rd century BC – sixth century AD), and Margiana (3rd century BC – sixth century AD). The area was incorporated into the Iranian Achaemenid Empire and, after a period of Macedonian rule, was ruled by the Iranian Parthian Empire and later by the Sasanian Empire, until the Muslim conquest of Persia in the seventh century.

The early Muslim conquests and the subsequent Samanid Empire converted most of the people, including the local ruling classes, into adherents of Islam. During this period, cities such as Samarkand, Khiva, and Bukhara began to grow rich from the Silk Road, and became a center of the Islamic Golden Age, with figures such as Muhammad al-Bukhari, Al-Tirmidhi, al Khwarizmi, al-Biruni, Avicenna, and Omar Khayyam.

The local Khwarazmian dynasty was destroyed by the Mongol invasion in the 13th century, leading to a dominance by Turkic peoples. Timur (Tamerlane), who in the 14th century established the Timurid Empire, was from Shahrisabz. Its capital was Samarkand, which became a centre of science under the rule of Ulugh Beg, giving birth to the Timurid Renaissance.

The territories of the Timurid dynasty were conquered by Uzbek Shaybanids in the 16th century, moving the centre of power to Bukhara. The region was split into three states: the Khanate of Khiva, Khanate of Kokand, and Emirate of Bukhara. Conquests by Emperor Babur towards the east led to the foundation of the Mughal Empire in India.

All of Central Asia was gradually incorporated into the Russian Empire during the 19th century, with Tashkent becoming the political center of Russian Turkestan. In 1924, national delimitation created the Uzbek Soviet Socialist Republic as a republic of the Soviet Union. Shortly before the dissolution of the Soviet Union, it declared independence as the Republic of Uzbekistan on 31 August 1991.

Uzbekistan is a secular state, with a presidential constitutional government in place. Uzbekistan comprises 12 regions (vilayats), Tashkent City, and one autonomous republic, Karakalpakstan. While non-governmental human rights organisations have defined Uzbekistan as "an authoritarian state with limited civil rights", significant reforms under Uzbekistan's second president, Shavkat Mirziyoyev, have been made following the death of the first president, Islam Karimov. Owing to these reforms, relations with the neighbouring countries of Kyrgyzstan, Tajikistan, and Afghanistan have drastically improved. A United Nations report of 2020 found much progress toward achieving the UN's Sustainable Development Goals.

The Uzbek economy is in a gradual transition to the market economy, with foreign trade policy being based on import substitution. In September 2017, the country's currency became fully convertible at market rates. Uzbekistan is a major producer and exporter of cotton. With the gigantic power-generation facilities from the Soviet era and an ample supply of natural gas, Uzbekistan has become the largest electricity producer in Central Asia.

From 2018 to 2021, the republic received a BB- sovereign credit rating by both Standard and Poor (S&P) and Fitch Ratings. The Brookings Institution described Uzbekistan as having large liquid assets, high economic growth, low public debt, and a low GDP per capita. Uzbekistan is a member of the Commonwealth of Independent States (CIS), United Nations and the Shanghai Cooperation Organisation (SCO).

Etymology 
The name "Uzbegistán" appears in the 16th century Tarikh-i Rashidi.

The origin of the word Uzbek remains disputed. Three views exist as to the adjective accompanying -stan (in the family of Indo-Iranian languages: "place of"):
 "free", "independent" or "own master/leader" requiring an amalgamation of uz (Turkic: "own"), bek ("master" or "leader")
 eponymously named after Oghuz Khagan, also known as Oghuz Beg
 A contraction of Uğuz, earlier Oğuz, that is, Oghuz (tribe), amalgamated with bek "oguz-leader".

All three have the middle syllable/phoneme being cognate with Turkic title Beg.

The name of the country was often spelled as ”Ўзбекистон” in Uzbek Cyrillic or “Узбекистан” in Russian during Soviet rule.

History 

The first people known to have inhabited Central Asia were Scythians who came from the northern grasslands of what is now Uzbekistan, sometime in the first millennium BC; when these nomads settled in the region they built an extensive irrigation system along the rivers. At this time, cities such as Bukhoro (Bukhara) and Samarqand (Samarkand) emerged as centres of government and high culture. By the fifth century BC, the Bactrian, Sogdian, and Tokharian states dominated the region.

As East Asia began to develop its silk trade with the West, Persian cities took advantage of this commerce by becoming centres of trade. Using an extensive network of cities and rural settlements in the province of Transoxiana, and further east in what is today Xinjiang, the Sogdian intermediaries became the wealthiest of these Iranian merchants. As a result of this trade on what became known as the Silk Route, Bukhara and Samarkand eventually became extremely wealthy cities, and at times Transoxiana (Mawarannahr) was one of the most influential and powerful Persian provinces of antiquity.

In 327 BC, Macedonian ruler Alexander the Great conquered the Persian Empire provinces of Sogdiana and Bactria, which contained the territories of modern Uzbekistan. Popular resistance to the conquest was fierce, causing Alexander's army to be bogged down in the region that became the northern part of the Macedonian Greco-Bactrian Kingdom. The kingdom was replaced with the Yuezhi-dominated Kushan Empire in the first century BC. For many centuries thereafter the region of Uzbekistan was ruled by the Persian empires, including the Parthian and Sassanid Empires, as well as by other empires, for example, those formed by the Turko-Persian Hephthalite and Turkic Gokturk peoples.

The Muslim conquests from the seventh century onward saw the Arabs bring Islam to Uzbekistan. In the same period, Islam began to take root among the nomadic Turkic peoples.

In the eighth century, Transoxiana, the territory between the Amudarya and Syrdarya rivers, was conquered by the Arabs (Qutayba ibn Muslim), becoming a focal point soon after the Islamic Golden Age.

In the ninth and tenth centuries, Transoxiana was brought into the Samanid State. Later, it saw the incursion of the Turkic-ruled Karakhanids, as well as the Seljuks (Sultan Sanjar) and Kara-Khitans.

The Mongol conquest under Genghis Khan during the 13th century brought change to the region. The Mongol invasion of Central Asia led to the displacement of some of the Iranian-speaking people of the region, their culture and heritage being superseded by that of the Mongolian-Turkic peoples who came thereafter. The invasions of Bukhara, Samarkand, Urgench and others resulted in mass murders and unprecedented destruction, which saw parts of Khwarezmia being completely razed.

Following the death of Genghis Khan in 1227, his empire was divided among his four sons and his family members. Despite the potential for serious fragmentation, there was an orderly succession for several generations, and control of most of Transoxiana stayed in the hands of the direct descendants of Chagatai Khan, the second son of Genghis Khan. Orderly succession, prosperity, and internal peace prevailed in the Chaghatai lands, and the Mongol Empire as a whole remained a strong and united kingdom, the Golden Horde.

After the decline of the Golden Horde, Khwarezm was briefly ruled by the Sufi Dynasty until Timur's conquest of it in 1388. Sufids rules Khwarezm as vassals of alternatively Timurids, Golden Horde and the Khanate of Bukhara until Persian occupation in 1510.

In the early 14th century, however, as the empire began to break up into its constituent parts, the Chaghatai territory was disrupted as the princes of various tribal groups competed for influence. One tribal chieftain, Timur (Tamerlane), emerged from these struggles in the 1380s as the dominant force in Transoxiana. Although he was not a descendant of Genghis Khan, Timur became the de facto ruler of Transoxiana and proceeded to conquer all of western Central Asia, Iran, the Caucasus, Mesopotamia, Asia Minor, and the southern steppe region north of the Aral Sea. He also invaded Russia before dying during an invasion of China in 1405. Timur was also known for his extreme brutality and his conquests were accompanied by genocidal massacres in the cities he occupied.

Timur initiated the last flowering of Transoxiana by gathering together numerous artisans and scholars from the vast lands he had conquered into his capital, Samarkand, thus imbuing his empire with a rich Perso-Islamic culture. During his reign and the reigns of his immediate descendants, a wide range of religious and palatial construction masterpieces were undertaken in Samarkand and other population centres. Amir Timur initiated an exchange of medical discoveries and patronised physicians, scientists and artists from the neighbouring regions such as India; His grandson Ulugh Beg was one of the world's first great astronomers. It was during the Timurid dynasty that Turkic, in the form of the Chaghatai dialect, became a literary language in its own right in Transoxiana, although the Timurids were Persianate in culture. The greatest Chaghataid writer, Ali-Shir Nava'i, was active in the city of Herat (now in northwestern Afghanistan) in the second half of the 15th century.

The Timurid state quickly split in half after the death of Timur. The chronic internal fighting of the Timurids attracted the attention of the Uzbek nomadic tribes living to the north of the Aral Sea. In 1501, the Uzbek forces began a wholesale invasion of Transoxiana. The slave trade in the Emirate of Bukhara became prominent and was firmly established at this time. Before the arrival of the Russians, present-day Uzbekistan was divided between the Emirate of Bukhara and the khanates of Khiva and Kokand.

In the 19th century, the Russian Empire began to expand and spread into Central Asia. There were 210,306 Russians living in Uzbekistan in 1912. The "Great Game" period is generally regarded as running from approximately 1813 to the Anglo-Russian Convention of 1907. A second, less intensive phase followed the Bolshevik Revolution of 1917. At the start of the 19th century, there were some  separating British India and the outlying regions of Tsarist Russia. Much of the land between was unmapped. In the early 1890s, Sven Hedin passed through Uzbekistan, during his first expedition.

By the beginning of 1920, Central Asia was firmly in the hands of Russia and, despite some early resistance to the Bolsheviks, Uzbekistan and the rest of Central Asia became a part of the Soviet Union. On 27 October 1924 the Uzbek Soviet Socialist Republic was created. From 1941 to 1945, during World War II, 1,433,230 people from Uzbekistan fought in the Red Army against Nazi Germany. A number also fought on the German side. As many as 263,005 Uzbek soldiers died in the battlefields of the Eastern Front, and 32,670 went missing in action.

On 20 June 1990, Uzbekistan declared its state sovereignty. On 31 August 1991, Uzbekistan declared independence after the failed coup attempt in Moscow. 1 September was proclaimed National Independence Day. The Soviet Union was dissolved on 26 December of that year. Islam Karimov, previously first secretary of the Communist Party of Uzbekistan since 1989, was elected president of the Uzbek Soviet Socialist Republic in 1990. After the collapse of the Soviet Union in 1991, he was elected president of independent Uzbekistan. An authoritarian ruler, Karimov died in September 2016. He was replaced by his long-time Prime Minister, Shavkat Mirziyoyev, on 14 December of the same year. On 6 November 2021, Mirziyoyev was sworn into his second term in office, after gaining a landslide victory in presidential election.

Geography 

It is the 56th largest country in the world by area and the 40th by population. Among the CIS countries, it is the fourth largest by area and the second largest by population.

Bordering Kazakhstan and the Aralkum Desert (former Aral Sea) to the north and northwest, Turkmenistan and Afghanistan to the southwest, Tajikistan to the southeast, and Kyrgyzstan to the northeast, Uzbekistan is one of the largest Central Asian states and the only Central Asian state to border all the other four. Uzbekistan also shares a short border (less than ) with Afghanistan to the south.

Uzbekistan is a hot, dry, landlocked country. It is one of two doubly landlocked countries in the world (that is, a landlocked country completely surrounded by other landlocked countries), the other being Liechtenstein. In addition, due to its location within a series of endorheic basins, none of its rivers lead to the sea. Less than 10% of its territory is intensively cultivated irrigated land in river valleys and oases, and formerly in the Aral Sea, which has largely desiccated in one of the world's worst environmental disasters. The rest is the vast Kyzylkum Desert and mountains.

The climate in Uzbekistan is continental, with little precipitation expected annually (100–200 millimetres, or 3.9–7.9 inches). The average summer high temperature tends to be 40 °C , while the average winter low temperature is around −23 °C .

Uzbekistan is home to six terrestrial ecoregions: Alai-Western Tian Shan steppe, Gissaro-Alai open woodlands, Badghyz and Karabil semi-desert, Central Asian northern desert, Central Asian riparian woodlands, and Central Asian southern desert.

Environment 

Uzbekistan has a rich and diverse natural environment. However, decades of Soviet policies in pursuit of greater cotton production have resulted in a catastrophic scenario with the agricultural industry being the main contributor to the pollution and devastation of both air and water in the country.

The Aral Sea was once the fourth-largest inland sea on Earth, humidifying the surrounding air and irrigating the arid land. Since the 1960s, when the overuse of the Aral Sea water began, it has shrunk to about 10% of its former area and divided into parts, with only the southern part of the narrow western lobe of the South Aral Sea remaining permanently in Uzbekistan. Much of the water was and continues to be used for the irrigation of cotton fields, a crop requiring a large amount of water to grow.

Due to the Aral Sea loss, high salinity and contamination of the soil with heavy elements are especially widespread in Karakalpakstan, the region of Uzbekistan adjacent to the Aral Sea. The bulk of the nation's water resources is used for farming, which accounts for nearly 84% of the water use and contributes to high soil salinity. Heavy use of pesticides and fertilisers for cotton growing further aggravates soil contamination.

According to the UNDP (United Nations Development Program), climate risk management in Uzbekistan should consider its ecological safety.

Numerous oil and gas deposits have been discovered in the south of the country.

Uzbekistan has also been home to seismic activity, as evidenced by the 1902 Andijan earthquake, 2011 Fergana Valley earthquake, and 1966 Tashkent earthquake.

A dam collapse at Sardoba reservoir in May 2020 flooded much farmland and many villages. The devastation extended into areas inside neighbouring Kazakhstan.

Politics 

After Uzbekistan declared independence from the Soviet Union in 1991, an election was held, and Islam Karimov was elected as the first President of Uzbekistan on 29 December 1991.

The elections of the Oliy Majlis (Parliament or Supreme Assembly) were held under a resolution adopted by the 16th Supreme Soviet in 1994. In that year, the Supreme Soviet was replaced by the Oliy Majlis.

The third elections for the bicameral 150-member Oliy Majlis, the Legislative Chamber, and the 100-member Senate for five-year terms, were held on 27 December 2009. The second elections were held from December 2004 to January 2005. The Oliy Majlis was unicameral up to 2004. Its size increased from 69 deputies (members) in 1994 to 120 in 2004–05 and currently stands at 150.

Karimov's first presidential term was extended to 2000 via a referendum, and he was re-elected in 2000, 2007, and 2015, each time receiving over 90% of the vote. Most international observers refused to participate in the process and did not recognise the results, dismissing them as not meeting basic standards.

The 2002 referendum also included a plan for a bicameral parliament consisting of a lower house (the Oliy Majlis) and an upper house (Senate). Members of the lower house are to be "full-time" legislators. Elections for the new bicameral parliament took place on 26 December.

Following Islam Karimov's death on 2 September 2016, the Oliy Majlis appointed Prime Minister Shavkat Mirziyoyev as interim president. Although the chairman of the Senate, Nigmatilla Yuldashev, was constitutionally designated as Karimov's successor, Yuldashev proposed that Mirziyoyev take the post of the interim president instead in light of Mirziyoyev's "many years of experience". Mirziyoyev was subsequently elected as the country's second president in the December 2016 presidential election, winning 88.6% of the vote, and was sworn in on 14 December. Deputy Prime Minister Abdulla Aripov replaced him as prime minister.

Mirziyoyev removed most of Karimov's officials and urged the government to employ "new, young people who love their country." After a year in office, Mirziyoyev moved away from many of his predecessor's policies. He visited all the Uzbek regions and big cities to get acquainted with the implementation of the projects and reforms which he ordered. Many analysts and Western media compared his rule with Chinese Communist Party leader Deng Xiaoping or Soviet Communist Party general secretary Mikhail Gorbachev. His rule has been quoted as being an "Uzbek Spring".

Foreign relations 

Uzbekistan joined the Commonwealth of Independent States in December 1991. However, it is opposed to reintegration and withdrew from the CIS collective security arrangement in 1999. Since that time, Uzbekistan has participated in the CIS peacekeeping force in Tajikistan and in UN-organized groups to help resolve the Tajikistan and Afghanistan conflicts, both of which it sees as posing threats to its own stability.

Previously close to Washington (which gave Uzbekistan half a billion dollars in aid in 2004, about a quarter of its military budget), the government of Uzbekistan has recently restricted American military use of the airbase at Karshi-Khanabad for air operations in neighbouring Afghanistan. Uzbekistan was an active supporter of U.S. efforts against worldwide terrorism.

The relationship between Uzbekistan and the United States began to deteriorate after the so-called "colour revolutions" in Georgia and Ukraine (and to a lesser extent Kyrgyzstan). When the U.S. joined in a call for an independent international investigation of the bloody events at Andijan, the relationship further declined, and President Islam Karimov changed the political alignment of the country to bring it closer to Russia and China.

In late July 2005, the government of Uzbekistan ordered the United States to vacate an airbase in Karshi-Kanabad (near Uzbekistan's border with Afghanistan) within 180 days. Karimov had offered use of the base to the U.S. shortly after 9/11. It is also believed by some Uzbeks that the protests in Andijan were brought about by the UK and U.S. influences in the area of Andijan. This is another reason for the hostility between Uzbekistan and the West.

Uzbekistan is a member of the United Nations (UN) (since 2 March 1992), the Euro-Atlantic Partnership Council (EAPC), Partnership for Peace (PfP), and the Organization for Security and Co-operation in Europe (OSCE). It belongs to the Organisation of Islamic Cooperation (OIC) and the Economic Cooperation Organization (ECO) (comprising the five Central Asian countries, Azerbaijan, Iran, Turkey, Afghanistan, and Pakistan). In 1999, Uzbekistan joined the GUAM alliance (Georgia, Ukraine, Azerbaijan and Moldova), which was formed in 1997 (making it GUUAM), but pulled out of the organisation in 2005.

Uzbekistan is also a member of the Shanghai Cooperation Organisation (SCO) and hosts the SCO's Regional Anti-Terrorist Structure (RATS) in Tashkent. Uzbekistan joined the new Central Asian Cooperation Organisation (CACO) in 2002. The CACO consists of Uzbekistan, Tajikistan, Kazakhstan, and Kyrgyzstan. It is a founding member of, and remains involved in, the Central Asian Union, formed with Kazakhstan and Kyrgyzstan, and joined in March 1998 by Tajikistan.

In December 1994 Uzbekistan applied for the World Trade Organization membership and received an observer status to start the accession process. The Working Party on the Accession of Uzbekistan to the WTO held its fourth meeting on 7 July 2020 — almost 15 years after its last formal meeting.

In September 2006, UNESCO presented Islam Karimov an award for Uzbekistan's preservation of its rich culture and traditions. Despite criticism, this seems to be a sign of improving relationships between Uzbekistan and the West.

The month of October 2006 also saw a decrease in the isolation of Uzbekistan from the West. The EU announced that it was planning to send a delegation to Uzbekistan to talk about human rights and liberties, after a long period of hostile relations between the two. Although it is equivocal about whether the official or unofficial version of the Andijan Massacre is true, the EU is evidently willing to ease its economic sanctions against Uzbekistan. Nevertheless, it is generally assumed among Uzbekistan's population that the government will stand firm in maintaining its close ties with the Russian Federation and in its theory that the 2004–2005 protests in Uzbekistan were promoted by the US and UK.

In January 2008, Lola Karimova-Tillyaeva was appointed to her current role as Uzbekistan's ambassador to UNESCO. Karimova-Tillyaeva and her team have been instrumental in promoting inter-cultural dialogue by increasing European society's awareness of Uzbekistan's cultural and historical heritage.

Human rights 

Non-governmental human rights organisations, such as IHF, Human Rights Watch, Amnesty International, as well as United States Department of State and Council of the European Union, define Uzbekistan as "an authoritarian state with limited civil rights" and express profound concern about "wide-scale violation of virtually all basic human rights".
According to the reports, the most widespread violations are torture, arbitrary arrests, and various restrictions of freedoms: of religion, of speech and press, of free association and assembly. It has also been reported that forced sterilisation of rural Uzbek women has been sanctioned by the government.
The reports maintain that the violations are most often committed against members of religious organisations, independent journalists, human rights activists and political activists, including members of the banned opposition parties. As of 2015, reports on violations on human rights in Uzbekistan indicated that violations were still going on without any improvement. The Freedom House has consistently ranked Uzbekistan near the bottom of its Freedom in the World ranking since the country's founding in 1991. In the 2018 report, Uzbekistan was one of the 11 worst countries for Political Rights and Civil Liberties.

The 2005 civil unrest in Uzbekistan, which resulted in several hundred people being killed, is viewed by many as a landmark event in the history of human rights abuse in Uzbekistan.
Concern has been expressed and requests for an independent investigation of the events has been made by the United States, the European Union, the United Nations, the OSCE Chairman-in-Office and the OSCE Office for Democratic Institutions and Human Rights.

The government of Uzbekistan is accused of unlawful termination of human life and of denying its citizens freedom of assembly and freedom of expression. The government vehemently rebuffs the accusations, maintaining that it merely conducted an anti-terrorist operation, exercising only necessary force. In addition, some officials claim that "an information war on Uzbekistan has been declared" and the human rights violations in Andijan are invented by the enemies of Uzbekistan as a convenient pretext for intervention in the country's internal affairs. Male homosexuality is illegal in Uzbekistan. Punishment ranges from a fine to 3 years in prison.

There are an estimated 1.2 million modern slaves in Uzbekistan, most work in the cotton industry. The government allegedly forces state employees to pick cotton in the autumn months. World Bank loans have been connected to projects that use child labour and forced labour practices in the cotton industry.

Recent developments 
Islam Karimov died in 2016 and his successor Shavkat Mirziyoyev is considered by most to be pursuing a less autocratic path by increasing co-operation with human rights NGOs, scheduling Soviet-style exit visas to be abolished in 2019, and reducing sentences for certain misdemeanor offences.

The Amnesty International report on the country for 2017–2018 found some remnant repressive measures and lack of rule of law in eradicating modern slavery. In February 2020, the United Nations announced that Uzbekistan made "major progress" on stamping out forced labour in its cotton harvest as 94% of pickers worked voluntarily.

Administrative divisions 

Uzbekistan is divided into twelve regions (viloyatlar, singular viloyat, compound noun viloyati e.g., Toshkent viloyati, Samarqand viloyati, etc.), one autonomous republic (respublika, compound noun respublikasi e.g. Qoraqalpogiston Muxtor Respublikasi, Karakalpakstan Autonomous Republic, etc.), and one independent city (shahar, compound noun shahri, e.g., Toshkent shahri). Names are given below in Uzbek, Russian, and Karakalpak languages when applicable, although numerous variations of the transliterations of each name exist.

The regions are further divided into districts (tuman).

Largest cities

Economy 

Uzbekistan mines 80 tons of gold annually, seventh in the world. Uzbekistan's copper deposits rank tenth in the world and its uranium deposits twelfth. The country's uranium production ranks seventh globally. The country has significant untapped reserves of oil and gas: there are 194 deposits of hydrocarbons in Uzbekistan, including 98 condensate and natural gas deposits and 96 gas condensate deposits.

Uzbekistan improved marginally in the 2020 Ease of Doing Business ranking by the World Bank.
The largest corporations involved in Uzbekistan's energy sector are the China National Petroleum Corporation (CNPC), Petronas, the Korea National Oil Corporation, Gazprom, Lukoil, and Uzbekneftegas.

Along with many Commonwealth of Independent States or CIS economies, Uzbekistan's economy declined during the first years of transition and then recovered after 1995, as the cumulative effect of policy reforms began to be felt. It has shown robust growth, rising by 4% per year between 1998 and 2003 and accelerating thereafter to 7%–8% per year. According to IMF estimates, the GDP in 2008 will be almost double its value in 1995 (in constant prices). Since 2003 annual inflation rates varied, reaching almost 40% in 2010 and less than 20% in 2019.

Uzbekistan has GNI per capita of US$2,020 in current dollars in 2018, giving a PPP equivalent of US$7,230. Economic production is concentrated in commodities. In 2011, Uzbekistan was the world's seventh-largest producer and fifth-largest exporter of cotton as well as the seventh-largest world producer of gold. It is also a regionally significant producer of natural gas, coal, copper, oil, silver and uranium.

Agriculture employs 27% of Uzbekistan's labour force and contributes 17.4% of its GDP (2012 data). Cultivable land is 4.4 million hectares, or about 10% of Uzbekistan's total area. While official unemployment is very low, underemployment – especially in rural areas – is estimated to be at least 20%. Cotton production in Uzbekistan is important to the national economy of the country. Uzbek cotton is even used to make banknotes in South Korea. The country has a considerable production of carrots as well. The use of child labour in Uzbekistan has led several companies, including Tesco, C&A, Marks & Spencer, Gap, and H&M, to boycott Uzbek cotton.

Facing a multitude of economic challenges upon acquiring independence, the government adopted an evolutionary reform strategy, with an emphasis on state control, reduction of imports and self-sufficiency in energy. Since 1994, the state-controlled media have repeatedly proclaimed the success of this "Uzbekistan Economic Model" and suggested that it is a unique example of a smooth transition to the market economy while avoiding shock, pauperism and stagnation. As of 2019, Uzbekistan's economy is one of the most diversified in Central Asia what makes the country an attractive economic partner for China.

The gradualist reform strategy has involved postponing significant macroeconomic and structural reforms. The state in the hands of the bureaucracy has remained a dominant influence in the economy. Corruption permeates the society and grows more rampant over time: Uzbekistan's 2005 Corruption Perception Index was 137 out of 159 countries, whereas in 2007 Uzbekistan was 175th out of 179 countries. A February 2006 report on the country by the International Crisis Group suggests that revenues earned from key exports, especially cotton, gold, corn and increasingly gas, are distributed among a very small circle of the ruling elite, with little or no benefit for the populace at large. The early-2010s high-profile corruption scandals involving government contracts and large international companies, notably TeliaSonera, have shown that businesses are particularly vulnerable to corruption when operating in Uzbekistan.

According to the Economist Intelligence Unit, "the government is hostile to allowing the development of an independent private sector, over which it would have no control".

The economic policies have repelled foreign investment, which is the lowest per capita in the CIS. For years, the largest barrier to foreign companies entering the Uzbekistan market has been the difficulty of converting currency. In 2003 the government accepted the obligations of Article VIII under the International Monetary Fund (IMF) providing for full currency convertibility. However, strict currency controls and the tightening of borders have lessened the effect of this measure.

Uzbekistan experienced rampant inflation of around 1000% per year immediately after independence (1992–1994). Stabilisation efforts implemented with guidance from the IMF paid off. The inflation rates were brought down to 50% in 1997 and then to 22% in 2002. Since 2003 annual inflation rates averaged less than 10%. Tight economic policies in 2004 resulted in a drastic reduction of inflation to 3.8% (although alternative estimates based on the price of a true market basket put it at 15%). The inflation rates moved up to 6.9% in 2006 and 7.6% in 2007 but have remained in the single-digit range.

The government of Uzbekistan restricts foreign imports in many ways, including high import duties. Excise taxes are applied in a highly discriminatory manner to protect locally produced goods, although the excises taxes were removed for foreign cars in 2020. Official tariffs are combined with unofficial, discriminatory charges resulting in total charges amounting to as much as 100 to 150% of the actual value of the product, making imported products virtually unaffordable. Import substitution is an officially declared policy and the government proudly reports a reduction by a factor of two in the volume of consumer goods imported. A number of CIS countries are officially exempt from Uzbekistan import duties. Uzbekistan has a Bilateral Investment Treaty with fifty other countries.

The Republican Stock Exchange (RSE) opened in 1994. The stocks of all Uzbek joint stock companies (around 1,250) are traded on RSE. The number of listed companies as of January 2013 exceeds 110. Securities market volume reached 2 trillion in 2012, and the number is rapidly growing due to the rising interest by companies of attracting necessary resources through the capital market. According to Central Depository as of January 2013 par value of outstanding shares of Uzbek emitters exceeded nine trillion.

Thanks in part to the recovery of world market prices of gold and cotton (the country's key export commodities), expanded natural gas and some manufacturing exports, and increasing labour migrant transfers, the current account turned into a large surplus (between 9% and 11% of GDP from 2003 to 2005). In 2018, foreign exchange reserves, including gold, totalled around US$25 billion.

Foreign exchange reserves amounted in 2010 to US$13 billion.

Uzbekistan is predicted to be one of the fastest-growing economies in the world (top 26) in future decades, according to a survey by global bank HSBC.

Demographics 

As of 2022, Uzbekistan has the largest population out of all the countries in Central Asia. Its 36 million citizens comprise nearly half the region's total population. The population of Uzbekistan is very young: 34.1% of its people are younger than 14 (2008 estimate). According to official sources, Uzbeks comprise a majority (84.5%) of the total population. Other ethnic groups include Russians 2.1%, Tajiks 4.8%, Kazakhs 2.4%, Karakalpaks 2.2% and Tatars 0.5% as of 2021.

There is some controversy about the percentage of the Tajik population. While official state numbers from Uzbekistan put the number around 5%, the number is said to be an understatement and some Western scholars put the number up to 10%–20%. Uzbekistan has an ethnic Korean population that was forcibly relocated to the region by Stalin from the Soviet Far East in 1937–1938. There are also small groups of Armenians in Uzbekistan, mostly in Tashkent and Samarkand.

The nation is 88% Muslim (mostly Sunni, with a 5% Shi'a minority), 9% Eastern Orthodox and 3% other faiths. The U.S. State Department's International Religious Freedom Report 2004 reports that 0.2% of the population are Buddhist (these being ethnic Koreans). The Bukharan Jews have lived in Central Asia, mostly in Uzbekistan, for thousands of years. There were 94,900 Jews in Uzbekistan in 1989 (about 0.5% of the population according to the 1989 census), but now, since the dissolution of the Soviet Union, most Central Asian Jews left the region for the United States, Germany, or Israel. Fewer than 5,000 Jews remained in Uzbekistan in 2007.

Russians in Uzbekistan represented 5.5% of the total population in 1989. During the Soviet period, Russians and Ukrainians constituted more than half the population of Tashkent. The country counted nearly 1.5 million Russians, 12.5% of the population, in the 1970 census. After the dissolution of the Soviet Union, significant emigration of ethnic Russians has taken place, mostly for economic reasons.

In the 1940s, the Crimean Tatars, along with the Volga Germans, Chechens, Pontic Greeks, Kumaks and many other nationalities were deported to Central Asia. Approximately 100,000 Crimean Tatars continue to live in Uzbekistan. The number of Greeks in Tashkent has decreased from 35,000 in 1974 to about 12,000 in 2004. The majority of Meskhetian Turks left the country after the pogroms in the Fergana valley in June 1989.

At least 10% of Uzbekistan's labour force works abroad (mostly in Russia and Kazakhstan) and other countries.

Uzbekistan has a 100% literacy rate among adults older than 15 (2019 estimate),

Life expectancy in Uzbekistan is 66 years among men and 72 years among women.

President Shavkat Mirziyoyev signed a law in March 2020 that demands a national census take place at least every 10 years. The population has not been officially counted in over 30 years. In November 2020, the first census was cancelled due to concerns about coronavirus and the sheer size of the task. It now has been postponed to 2023.

Religion 

Uzbekistan is a secular country and Article 61 of its constitution states that religious organizations and associations shall be separated from the state and equal before law. The state shall not interfere in the activity of religious associations. Islam is the dominant religion in Uzbekistan, although Soviet power (1924–1991) discouraged the expression of religious belief, and it was repressed during its existence as a Soviet Republic. The CIA Factbook estimate that Muslims constitute 88% of the population, while 9% of the population follow Russian Orthodox Christianity, 3% other religions and non-religious. While a 2020 Pew Research Center projection stated that Uzbekistan's population is 97.1% Muslim and Russian Orthodox Christians comprised 2.0% of the population. An estimated 93,000 Jews lived in the country in the early 1990s.
In addition, there are about 7,400 Zoroastrians left in Uzbekistan, mostly in Tajik areas like Khojand.

Despite the predominance of Islam and its rich history in the country, the practice of the faith is far from monolithic. Uzbeks have practised many versions of Islam. The conflict of Islamic tradition with various agendas of reform or secularisation throughout the 20th century has left a wide variety of Islamic practices in Central Asia.

The end of Soviet control in Uzbekistan in 1991 did not bring an immediate upsurge of religion-associated fundamentalism, as many had predicted, but rather a gradual re-acquaintance with the precepts of the Islamic faith and a gradual resurgence of Islam in the country. However, since 2015 there has been a slight increase in Islamist activity, with small organisations such as the Islamic Movement of Uzbekistan declaring allegiance to ISIL and contributing fighters abroad, although the terror threat in Uzbekistan itself remains low. (See Terrorism in Uzbekistan).

Jewish community 

The Jewish community in the Uzbek lands flourished for centuries, with occasional hardships during the reigns of certain rulers. During the rule of Tamerlane in the 14th century, Jews contributed greatly to his efforts to rebuild Samarkand, and a great Jewish centre was established there.

After the area came under Russian rule in 1868, Jews were granted equal rights with the local Muslim population. In that period some 50,000 Jews lived in Samarkand and 20,000 in Bukhara.

After the Russian revolutions in 1917 and the establishment of the Soviet regime, Jewish religious life (as with all religions) became restricted. By 1935 only one synagogue out of 30 remained in Samarkand; nevertheless, underground Jewish community life continued during the Soviet era.

By 1970 there were 103,000 Jews registered in the Uzbek SSR. Since the 1980s most of the Jews of Uzbekistan emigrated to Israel or to the United States of America. A small community of several thousand remained in the country : some 7,000 lived in Tashkent, 3,000 in Bukhara and 700 in Samarkand.

Languages 

The Uzbek language is one of the Turkic languages, close to the Uyghur language, and both of them belong to the Karluk branch of the Turkic language family. It is the only official national language and since 1992 is officially written in the Latin alphabet.

Before the 1920s, the written language of Uzbeks was called Turki (known to Western scholars as Chagatai) and used the Nastaʿlīq script. In 1926 the Latin alphabet was introduced and went through several revisions throughout the 1930s. Finally, in 1940, the Cyrillic alphabet was introduced by Soviet authorities and was used until the fall of Soviet Union. In 1993 Uzbekistan shifted back to the Latin script (Uzbek alphabet), which was modified in 1996 and is being taught in schools since 2000. Educational establishments teach only the Latin notation. At the same time, the Cyrillic notation is common among the older generation. Even though the Cyrillic notation of Uzbek has now been abolished for official documents, it is still used by a number of popular newspapers and websites whilst a few TV channels duplicate the Latin notation with the Cyrillic one.

Karakalpak, belonging to the Kipchak branch of the Turkic language family and thus closer to Kazakh, is spoken by half a million people, primarily in the Republic of Karakalpakstan, and has an official status in that territory.

Although the Russian language is not an official language in the country, it is widely used in many fields. Digital information from the government is bilingual. The country is also home to approximately one million native Russian speakers.

The Tajik language (a variety of Persian) is widespread in the cities of Bukhara and Samarkand because of their relatively large population of ethnic Tajiks. It is also found in large pockets in Kasansay, Chust, Rishtan and Sokh in Ferghana Valley, as well as in Burchmulla, Ahangaran, Baghistan in the middle Syr Darya district, and finally in, Shahrisabz, Qarshi, Kitab and the river valleys of Kafiringan and Chaganian, forming altogether, approximately 10–15% of the population of Uzbekistan.

There are no language requirements to attain citizenship in Uzbekistan.

In April 2020, a draft bill was introduced in Uzbekistan to regulate the exclusive use of the Uzbek language in government affairs. Under this legislation, government workers could incur fines for doing work in languages other than Uzbek. Though unsuccessful, it was met with criticism by the Russian Ministry of Foreign Affairs spokeswoman, Maria Zakharova. In response, a group of Uzbek intellectuals signed an open letter arguing for the instatement of Russian as an official language alongside Uzbek, citing historical ties, the large Russian-speaking population in Uzbekistan, and the usefulness of Russian in higher education, together with the argument that only Russian language opened the communication with the other peoples of the region and the literature of the outside world. Still, the Russian language has an extensive presence in Uzbekistan. The Cyrillic Uzbek alphabet is still widely used, and 862 Russian-language schools are functioning in the country, compared to 1,100 in 1991, despite the fact that the Russian minority there has decreased from 1,7 million in 1990 to nearly 700,000 in 2022. In business, the Russian language outpaces Uzbek. Many Uzbeks in urban areas, as of 2019, are feeling more comfortable to speak in Russian, while Uzbek is more present in the agricultural regions. Uzbek did not manage to become a state language, and many blame the intelligentsia.

Communications 

According to the official source report, as of 10 March 2008, the number of cellular phone users in Uzbekistan reached 7 million, up from 3.7 million on 1 July 2007. Mobile users in 2017 were more than 24 million. The largest mobile operator in terms of number of subscribers is MTS-Uzbekistan (former Uzdunrobita and part of Russian Mobile TeleSystems) and it is followed by Beeline (part of Russia's Beeline) and UCell (ex Coscom) (originally part of the U.S. MCT Corp., now a subsidiary of the Nordic/Baltic telecommunication company TeliaSonera AB).

As of 2019, the estimated number of internet users was more than 22 million or about 52% of the population.

Internet Censorship exists in Uzbekistan and in October 2012 the government toughened internet censorship by blocking access to proxy servers. Reporters Without Borders has named Uzbekistan's government an "Enemy of the Internet" and government control over the internet has increased dramatically since the start of the Arab Spring.

The press in Uzbekistan practices self-censorship and foreign journalists have been gradually expelled from the country since the Andijan massacre of 2005 when government troops fired into crowds of protesters killing 187 according to official reports and estimates of several hundred by unofficial and witness accounts.

Transportation 

Tashkent, the nation's capital and largest city, has a four-line metro built in 1977, and expanded in 2001 after ten years' independence from the Soviet Union. Uzbekistan and Kazakhstan are currently the only two countries in Central Asia with a subway system. It is promoted as one of the cleanest systems in the former Soviet Union. The stations are exceedingly ornate. For example, the station Metro Kosmonavtov built in 1984 is decorated using a space travel theme to recognise the achievements of humankind in space exploration and to commemorate the role of Vladimir Dzhanibekov, the Soviet cosmonaut of Uzbek origin. A statue of Vladimir Dzhanibekov stands near a station entrance.

There are government-operated trams and buses running across the city. There are also many taxis, registered and unregistered. Uzbekistan has plants that produce modern cars. The car production is supported by the government and the Korean auto company Daewoo. In May 2007 UzDaewooAuto, the car maker, signed a strategic agreement with General Motors-Daewoo Auto and Technology (GMDAT, see GM Uzbekistan also). The government bought a stake in Turkey's Koc in SamKochAvto, a producer of small buses and lorries. Afterward, it signed an agreement with Isuzu Motors of Japan to produce Isuzu buses and lorries.

Train links connect many towns in Uzbekistan, as well as neighbouring former republics of the Soviet Union. Moreover, after independence two fast-running train systems were established. Uzbekistan launched the first high-speed railway in Central Asia in September 2011 between Tashkent and Samarqand. The new high-speed electric train Talgo 250, called Afrosiyob, was manufactured by Patentes Talgo S.L. (Spain) and took its first trip from Tashkent to Samarkand on 26 August 2011.

There is a large aeroplane plant that was built during the Soviet era – Tashkent Chkalov Aviation Manufacturing Plant or ТАПОиЧ in Russian. The plant originated during World War II, when production facilities were evacuated south and east to avoid capture by advancing Nazi forces. Until the late 1980s, the plant was one of the leading aeroplane production centres in the USSR. With dissolution of the Soviet Union, its manufacturing equipment became outdated; most of the workers were laid off. Now it produces only a few planes a year, but with interest from Russian companies growing, there are rumours of production-enhancement plans.

Military 

With close to 65,000 servicemen, Uzbekistan possesses the largest armed forces in Central Asia. The military structure is largely inherited from the Turkestan Military District of the Soviet Army. The Uzbek Armed Forces' equipment is standard, mostly consisting those of post-Soviet inheritance and newly crafted Russian and some American equipment.

The government has accepted the arms control obligations of the former Soviet Union, acceded to the Nuclear Non-Proliferation Treaty (as a non-nuclear state), and supported an active program by the U.S. Defense Threat Reduction Agency (DTRA) in western Uzbekistan (Nukus and Vozrozhdeniye Island). The Government of Uzbekistan spends about 3.7% of GDP on the military but has received a growing infusion of Foreign Military Financing (FMF) and other security assistance funds since 1998.

Following 11 September 2001 terrorist attacks in the U.S., Uzbekistan approved the U.S. Central Command's request for access to an air base, the Karshi-Khanabad airfield, in southern Uzbekistan. However, Uzbekistan demanded that the U.S. withdraw from the airbases after the Andijan massacre and the U.S. reaction to this massacre. The last US troops left Uzbekistan in November 2005. In 2020, it was revealed that the former US base was contaminated with radioactive materials which may have resulted in unusually high cancer rates in US personnel stationed there. Yet the government of Uzbekistan has denied this statement claiming that there has never been such a case.

On 23 June 2006, Uzbekistan became a full participant in the Collective Security Treaty Organization (CSTO), but informed the CSTO to suspend its membership in June 2012.

Culture 

Uzbekistan has a wide mix of ethnic groups and cultures, with the Uzbek being the majority group. In 1995 about 71% of Uzbekistan's population was Uzbek. The chief minority groups were Russians (8%), Tajiks (3–4.7%), Kazakhs (4%), Tatars (2.5%) and Karakalpaks (2%). It is said, however, that non-Uzbeks decline as Russians and other minority groups slowly leave and Uzbeks return from other parts of the former Soviet Union.

When Uzbekistan gained independence in 1991, there was concern that Muslim fundamentalism would spread across the region. The expectation was that a country long denied freedom of religious practice would undergo a very rapid increase in the expression of its dominant faith.

According to a 2009 Pew Research Center report, Uzbekistan's population is 96.3% Muslim, around 54% identifies as non-denominational Muslim, 18% as Sunni and 1% as Shia. And around 11% say they belong to a Sufi order.

Music 

Central Asian classical music is called Shashmaqam, which arose in Bukhara in the late 16th century when that city was a regional capital.  Shashmaqam is closely related to Azerbaijani Mugam and Uyghur muqam. The name, which translates as six maqams refers to the structure of the music, which contains six sections in six different Musical modes, similar to classical Persian traditional music. Interludes of spoken Sufi poetry interrupt the music, typically beginning at a lower register and gradually ascending to a climax before calming back down to the beginning tone.

Education 

Uzbekistan has a high literacy rate, with 99.9% of adults above the age of 15 being able to read and write. However, with only 76% of the under-15 population currently enrolled in education (and only 20% of the 3–6 year olds attending pre-school), this figure may drop in the future. Students attend school Monday through Saturday during the school year, and education officially concludes at the end of the 11th grade.

There are two international schools operating in Uzbekistan, both in Tashkent: The British School catering for elementary students only, and Tashkent International School, a K-12 international curriculum school.

Uzbekistan has encountered severe budget shortfalls in its education program. The education law of 1992 began the process of theoretical reform, but the physical base has deteriorated and curriculum revision has been slow. Corruption within the education system is rampant, with students from wealthier families routinely bribing teachers and school executives to achieve high grades without attending school, or undertaking official examinations.

Several universities, including Westminster University, Turin University, Management University Institute of Singapore, Bucheon University in Tashkent, TEAM University and Inha University Tashkent maintain a campus in Tashkent offering English language courses across several disciplines. The Russian-language high education is provided by most national universities, including foreign Moscow State University and Gubkin Russian State University of Oil and Gas, maintaining campuses in Tashkent. As of 2019, Webster University, in partnership with the Ministry of Education, has opened a graduate school offering an MBA in Project Management and a MA in Teaching English as a Second Language (TESL).
There are three islamic institutes and an academy in Uzbekistan. They are Mir Arab high school|School of hadith knowledge|International islamic academy of Uzbekistan

Holidays 

 1 January: New Year's Day, "Yangi Yil Bayrami"
 14 January: Day of Defenders of the Motherland, "Vatan Himoyachilari kuni"
 8 March: International Women's Day, "Xalqaro Xotin-Qizlar kuni"
 21 March: Nowruz, "Navroz Bayrami"
 9 May: Day of Remembrance and Honour, "Xotira va Qadrlash kuni"
 1 September: Independence Day, "Mustaqillik kuni"
 1 October: Teachers' Day, "Oqituvchi va Murabbiylar kuni"
 8 December: Constitution Day, "Konstitutsiya kuni"
 

Variable date
 End of Ramadan, Ramazon Hayiti (Eid al-Fitr)
 70 days later, Qurbon Hayiti (Eid al-Adha)

Cuisine 

Uzbek cuisine is influenced by local agriculture; since there is a great deal of grain farming in Uzbekistan, bread and noodles are of importance and Uzbek cuisine has been characterised as "noodle-rich". Mutton is a popular variety of meat due to the abundance of sheep in the country and it is part of various Uzbek dishes.

Uzbekistan's signature dish is palov (or plov), a main course typically made with rice, meat, carrots, and onions, though it was not available to ordinary people until the 1930s. There are many regional variations of the dish. Often the fat found near the sheep tail, qurdiuq, is used. In the past, the cooking of palov was reserved for men, but the Soviets allowed women to cook it as well. Since then, it seems, the old gender roles have been restored.

Other notable national dishes include shurpa, a soup made of large pieces of fatty meat (usually mutton), and fresh vegetables; norin and laghman, noodle-based dishes that may be served as a soup or a main course; manti, chuchvara, and somsa, stuffed pockets of dough served as an appetizer or a main course; dimlama, a meat and vegetable stew; and various kebabs, usually served as a main course.

Green tea is the national hot beverage consumed throughout the day; teahouses (chaikhanas) are of cultural importance. Black tea is preferred in Tashkent, but both green and black teas are consumed daily, without milk or sugar. Tea always accompanies a meal, but it is also a drink of hospitality that is automatically offered: green or black to every guest. Ayran, a chilled yogurt drink, is popular in summer.

The use of alcohol is less widespread than in the West, but wine is comparatively popular for a Muslim nation as Uzbekistan is largely secular. Uzbekistan has 14 wineries, the oldest and most famous being the Khovrenko Winery in Samarkand (established in 1927). A number of vineyards in and around Tashkent are also growing in popularity, including Chateau Hamkor.

Sport 

Uzbekistan is home to former racing cyclist Djamolidine Abdoujaparov. Abdoujaparov has won the green jersey points contest in the Tour de France three times. Abdoujaparov was a specialist at winning stages in tours or one-day races when the bunch or peloton would finish together. He would often 'sprint' in the final kilometer and had a reputation as being dangerous in these bunch sprints as he would weave from side to side. This reputation earned him the nickname 'The Terror of Tashkent'.

Artur Taymazov won Uzbekistan's inaugural wrestling medal at the 2000 Summer Olympics, followed by three Olympic gold medals in Men's 120 kg in 2004, 2008 and 2012. His 2008 gold was taken away in 2017 after a re-testing of samples from the Beijing Games and Taymazov was later stripped of his London 2012 Olympic gold medal after re-analysis of stored samples in 2019. His London gold had made him the most successful freestyle competitor in Olympic history. He is the 60th athlete to be disqualified from the London Olympics after the event.

Ruslan Chagaev is a former professional boxer representing Uzbekistan in the WBA. He won the WBA champion title in 2007 after defeating Nikolai Valuev. Chagaev defended his title twice before losing it to Vladimir Klitschko in 2009. Another young talented boxer Hasanboy Dusmatov, light flyweight champion at the 2016 Summer Olympics, won the Val Barker Trophy for the outstanding male boxer of Rio 2016 on 21 August 2016. On 21 December 2016 Dusmatov was honoured with the AIBA Boxer of the Year award at a 70-year anniversary event of AIBA.

Michael Kolganov, an Uzbek–born sprint canoer, was world champion and won an Olympic bronze in Sydney in the K1 500-meter in 2000 on behalf of Israel. In 2009 and 2011, another Uzbek émigré, gymnast Alexander Shatilov, won a world bronze medal as an artistic gymnast in floor exercise, though he lives in and represents Israel in international competitions. Oksana Chusovitina has attended eight Olympic games, and won five world medals in artistic gymnastics including an Olympic gold. Some of those medals were won while representing Germany and the Soviet Union, though she currently competes for Uzbekistan.

Uzbekistan is the home of the International Kurash Association. Kurash is an internationalised and modernised form of traditional Uzbek wrestling.

Football is the most popular sport in Uzbekistan. Uzbekistan's premier football league is the Uzbek Super League, which has consisted of 16 teams since 2015. The current champions (2022) are FC Pakhtakor. Pakhtakor holds the record for the most Uzbekistan champion titles, having won the league ten times. Uzbekistan's football clubs regularly participate in the AFC Champions League and the AFC Cup. FC Nasaf Qarashi won the AFC Cup in 2011, the first international club cup for Uzbek football.

Humo Tashkent, a professional ice hockey team was established in 2019 with the aim of joining Kontinental Hockey League (KHL), a top level Eurasian league in the future. Humo will join the second-tier Supreme Hockey League (VHL) for the 2019–20 season. Humo play their games at the Humo Ice Dome which cost over €175 million in construction; both the team and arena derive their name from the mythical Huma bird, a symbol of happiness and freedom. Uzbekistan Hockey Federation (UHF) began preparation for forming national ice hockey team in joining IIHF competitions.

Before Uzbekistan's independence in 1991, the country was part of the Soviet Union football, rugby union, basketball, ice hockey, and handball national teams. After independence, Uzbekistan created its own football, rugby union, basketball and futsal national teams.

Tennis is a very popular sport in Uzbekistan, especially after Uzbekistan's sovereignty in 1991. Uzbekistan has its own Tennis Federation called the "UTF" (Uzbekistan Tennis Federation), created in 2002. Uzbekistan also hosts an International WTA tennis tournament, the "Tashkent Open", held in Uzbekistan's capital city. This tournament has been held since 1999, and is played on outdoor hard courts. The most notable active players from Uzbekistan are Denis Istomin and Akgul Amanmuradova.

Chess is quite popular in Uzbekistan. The country boasts Rustam Kasimdzhanov, who was the FIDE World Chess Champion in 2004, and many junior players like Nodirbek Abdusattorov, the 2021 World Rapid Chess Champion. The Uzbek team - consisting of GM Nodirbek Abdusattorov, GM Nodirbek Yakubboev, GM Javokhir Sindarov, GM Shamsiddin Vokhidov and GM Jahongir Vakhidov won gold at the 44th Chess Olympiad in Chennai.

Other popular sports in Uzbekistan include basketball, judo, team handball, baseball, taekwondo, and futsal.

Ulugbek Rashitov, won the country's first olympic gold medal in taekwondo, at the Summer Olympic Games in Tokyo 2021.

In 2022, the World Judo Championships were held in Tashkent.

See also 

 Health in Uzbekistan
 Outline of Uzbekistan

References

Further reading 

 Nahaylo, Bohdan and Victor Swoboda. Soviet Disunion: A History of the Nationalities problem in the USSR (1990)  excerpt
 Rashid, Ahmed. The Resurgence of Central Asia: Islam or Nationalism? (2017)
 Smith, Graham,  ed. The Nationalities Question in the Soviet Union (2nd ed. 1995)

External links 

 National Information Agency of Uzbekistan
 Lower House of Uzbekistan parliament
 Digital Agency  Uzbekistan To Business Digital Agency
 Chief of State and Cabinet Members

General information
 Uzbekistan. The World Factbook. Central Intelligence Agency.
 Uzbekistan Corruption Profile  from the Business Anti-Corruption Portal
 Uzbekistan from the U.S. Library of Congress includes Background Notes, Country Study and major reports
 Uzbek Publishing and National Bibliography from the University of Illinois Slavic and East European Library
 Uzbekistan at UCB Libraries GovPubs
 List of cities and populations
 
 Uzbekistan profile from the BBC News
 
 Key Development Forecasts for Uzbekistan from International Futures

Media
 National Television and Radio Company of Uzbekistan

 
Central Asian countries
Landlocked countries
Member states of the Commonwealth of Independent States
Member states of the Organisation of Islamic Cooperation
Member states of the Shanghai Cooperation Organisation
Member states of the United Nations
States and territories established in 1991
Republics
1991 establishments in Asia
Countries in Asia
Members of the International Organization of Turkic Culture
Member states of the Organization of Turkic States